Yangel may refer to:
Mikhail Yangel (1911–1971), Soviet missile designer
Yangel', a lunar impact crater
3039 Yangel, a main-belt asteroid
Yangel (urban-type settlement), an urban-type settlement in Irkutsk Oblast, Russia